Zo In-sung (born July 28, 1981) is a South Korean actor. He is best known for his leading roles in the Korean television dramas Something Happened in Bali (2004), Spring Day (2005), That Winter, the Wind Blows (2013), and It's Okay, That's Love (2014).

In film, he is known for his roles in The Classic (2003), A Dirty Carnival (2006), A Frozen Flower (2008), The King (2017), The Great Battle (2018), and Escape from Mogadishu (2021). He also hosted the reality show Unexpected Business.

His name is currently officially romanized as Zo In-sung, previously as Cho In-sung, and sometimes as Jo In-sung.

Early life 
Zo In-sung was born and raised in Gangdong District, Seoul.

Zo studied modeling and events management  at Chunnam Techno University. He later enrolled as a Theater and Film major at Dongguk University, but was expelled in 2007 due to inadequate class attendance.

Career

1998–2002: Beginnings and rise to fame
Zo made his entertainment debut in 1998 as a model for clothing brand Ziozia. He began his acting career in 1999 through the MBC sitcom Jump and, in 2000, starred in the teen drama School 3 and in the second season of the sitcom Nonstop.

Zo first drew notice with a supporting role in the 2001 television drama Piano, co-starring Go Soo and Kim Ha-neul. He was then cast in his first drama leading role in 2002, as an illiterate actor in Shoot for the Stars opposite Jeon Do-yeon. The same year, he made his film debut in the movie Public Toilet. He also starred in several music videos of popular boy band g.o.d, a fellow SidusHQ artiste at that time, and was directed by actor Jung Woo-sung.

2003–2008: Mainstream popularity
In 2003, Zo starred in three romantic films, most notably Kwak Jae-yong's The Classic, with Son Ye-jin and Cho Seung-woo.

In 2004, he returned to television in the melodrama Something Happened in Bali, alongside Ha Ji-won and So Ji-sub. Something Happened was a huge success, with its final episode reaching a peak rating of 39.7%. Zo won Best Actor awards at both the Baeksang Arts Awards and SBS Drama Awards.

In 2005, he starred opposite Go Hyun-jung in her comeback drama Spring Day, a remake of the Japanese drama Heaven's Coin.

Zo collaborated with renowned director Yoo Ha in his next two films: 2006's A Dirty Carnival, in which he played a charismatic small-time gangster who seeks a happier life, and 2008's A Frozen Flower, a Goryeo-period film where his royal bodyguard character is caught in a love triangle between the king and the queen.

2009–2012: Enlistment
On April 7, 2009, Zo enlisted for his two-year mandatory military service; he reportedly wanted to join the Air Force to follow in the footsteps of his father, who served as a non-commissioned officer. He served 25 months in the Air Force and the Air Force military band, and was discharged on May 4, 2011.

Upon the expiry of his contract with talent agency SidusHQ, Zo joined IOK Company in March 2012.

2013–present: Return to television and international recognition 
In 2013, he co-starred in the melodrama That Winter, the Wind Blows alongside Song Hye-kyo, a remake of the Japanese drama . The drama placed number one in its time slot during most of its run, and Zo and Song were praised for their performances. A year later, Zo reunited with That Winter'''s teleplay writer and director in SBS's medical melodrama It's Okay, That's Love opposite Gong Hyo-jin. Zo won the Daesang (Grand Prize), the highest honor for television at the APAN Star Awards.

In 2016, Zo was chosen as the ambassador of the National Tax Service alongside Choi Ji-woo.

In 2017, Zo starred in the crime thriller The King alongside Jung Woo-sung, directed by The Face Reader director Han Jae-rim. In 2018, he stars in the historical film The Great Battle''

Endorsement 
In 2001, Zo earned title best male rookie for CF model. in 2002, Zo ranked First among male celebrity as "the celebrity who is likely to appear the most in CF this year". In 2004, He paired with Lee Yeon-hee as advertising model for camera brand. In 2006 Zo was model of electronic home appliance brands. In 2007, He became face of a cosmetic brand. In 2008, He paired with Han Hyo-joo to advertise coffee brand.

After being discharged from the military in 2011, Zo reclaimed his CF King title. He was selected as a brand advertising model for SK Telesis 'W'. He signed with home appliance brands. Zo also signed contracts with food and beverage such as Outback Steakhouse, Cass Beer, and Woongjin Foods. In 2014, He went to Himalaya to film for outdoor clothing brand. He was with the brand for five years from 2011 to 2016. In 2016 Angel-in-us wanted to shoot women's hearts with Jo In-sung as model. In the following year Zo, then became model for bedding product. Zo signed with Asahi Beer in 2018. In 2019, Zo signed as an advertising model of food brand Ottogi.

In 2020, Zo paired with Han Ji-min to advertise health food brand. In February 2021, IOK Company announced on that Zo is the exclusive model of Ranking Chicken Com. Ranking Chicken Com is an online platform that provides a service that allows consumers to compare and buy various chicken breast brands. In September, Zo was signed as ambassador for a luxury shopping platform. In the end of 2021, Zo re-signed as an advertising model of food brand Ottogi. It was announced on January 15, 2022 that sales of dumpling jumped 167% compared to the same month of the previous year, recording the highest monthly sales since its launch. Ottogi released new 'XO dumplings' advertisement featuring actor Zo in the winter, the peak season for frozen dumplings.

Personal life 
In 2013, it was reported that Zo and Kim Min-hee have been in a relationship since early year. Both their agencies confirmed. On September 24, 2014, Zo and Kim confirmed that they ended their year-and-a-half-long relationship.

Philanthrophy 
According to a non-governmental organization MIRAL Welfare Foundation, Jo has generously donated 500 million won (almost 440 thousand dollars) to help the people in Tanzania. The foundation also stated that the donation was used to build Singida New Vision School located in central Tanzania.

Filmography

Film

Television series

Television shows

Music video appearances

Awards and nominations

State honors

Listicles

References

External links 
 
 
 

20th-century South Korean male actors
21st-century South Korean male actors
1981 births
IHQ (company) artists
Living people
Male actors from Seoul
Models from Seoul
Republic of Korea Air Force personnel
South Korean male film actors
South Korean male models
South Korean male television actors